David Ginola-Ceze (born 25 January 1967) is a French former professional footballer who has also worked as an actor, model and football pundit.

A former forward, Ginola played football for ten seasons in France before moving from Paris Saint-Germain to Newcastle United in the English Premier League in July 1995. He continued playing in the Premier League for Tottenham Hotspur, Aston Villa and Everton before retiring in 2002. At international level, he made 17 appearances scoring three goals for the France national team between 1990 and 1995.

Since his retirement from football, he has become involved in football punditry and acting. Ginola is a regular contributor to BBC, BT Sport and CNN. He has hosted Match of ze Day, a program which broadcasts live Premier League matches on Canal+. In January 2015, Ginola attempted to run for the FIFA presidency but withdrew after failing to receive the required backing of at least five national football associations.

Early life
Ginola was born in Gassin, Var.

Club career
Ginola played at club level for Toulon (1985–88), RC Paris (1988–90), Brest (1990–92), Paris Saint-Germain (1992–95), Newcastle United (1995–97), Tottenham Hotspur (1997–2000), Aston Villa (2000–2002) and Everton (2002).

Ginola made his first senior appearance for Sporting Toulon as an eighteen-year-old in a 1985 2–0 victory away at Metz. He played fourteen times in his first season, and by 1986 he was a regular in the Toulon line-up. In 1988, he moved to RC Paris, where he remained until signing for Brest in 1990. There, he began to impress with his flamboyant style of play. In 1991, he played a crucial role in a landmark victory (3–2) against the side who would go on to sign him, Paris Saint-Germain F.C.

Paris Saint-Germain
Ginola joined Paris Saint-Germain in January 1992, at a time when it was pushing for major honours with the financial backing of TV channel Canal+. He quickly adapted to the club and became a fan favourite noted for his elegant first touch and flair. His popularity did not suffer any consequence even when he admitted that he supported Paris Saint-Germain's rivals Olympique Marseille as a boy and that he would have joined them rather than PSG. In his first full season (1992–93), Ginola won the Coupe de France (scoring in the final) and reached the semi-finals of the UEFA Cup. At the end of 1993, he was also won the French Footballer of the Year award from the France Football magazine.

In his second full season in 1993–94, PSG won the second league title of its history, losing only three times. Alongside Paul Le Guen, Bernard Lama and Antoine Kombouaré and coached by Artur Jorge, Ginola provided 13 goals in 38 games, which made him the top club goalscorer.

The following season, under new manager Luis Fernandez, proved to be less successful in the league, with FC Nantes being crowned champions. Ginola scored 11 times in 28 league appearances. Paris Saint-Germain did shine in the cup competitions though, winning another Coupe de France as well as the first edition of the new Coupe de la Ligue. In the UEFA Champions League, the Parisian club caused a major shock after knocking out 1994's finalists FC Barcelona in the quarter finals, with Ginola playing particularly well. The club was eliminated at the next hurdle by defending champions A.C. Milan.

In the summer of 1995, Ginola decided to leave France. Known to be a Spanish football enthusiast, he was expected to be snapped up by Barcelona. Furthermore, between 1992 and 1995, his stellar displays in European competitions against the Spanish giants Real Madrid and Barcelona had attracted media attention in Spain, with local media dubbing him "El Magnifico".

Newcastle United
In 1995, Ginola joined Newcastle United for £2.5 million. He was signed at a time when manager Kevin Keegan was attempting to turn the club into one of the major forces in English football, and the board was prepared to offer strong financial backing to sign a number of European superstars. Ginola made his debut against Coventry City on 19 August 1995 in a 3–0 win. He scored his first league goal on 27 August against Sheffield Wednesday in a 2–0 away win, and went on to score five league goals in his first season. In the 1995–96, Newcastle finished second, four points behind Manchester United. This was their strongest league performance in decades, and Ginola was an integral part of the team. However, it was a major disappointment that Newcastle had finished second in the Premier League as they had led by up to 10 points as late as January.

In 1996, Bobby Robson, manager of Barcelona, attempted personally to sign Ginola, but Newcastle refused to allow the transfer. To add to their line-up, Newcastle paid £15m, breaking the transfer record, to sign Alan Shearer. Despite this, Newcastle finished second again, being narrowly overtaken by Manchester United. Halfway through the season, Kevin Keegan suddenly resigned as manager to be succeeded by Kenny Dalglish. Ginola fell out of favour and sought a transfer elsewhere.

Tottenham Hotspur
Tottenham Hotspur signed Ginola in July 1997 for £2.5 million, where he was joined by Newcastle teammate Les Ferdinand. In 1999, he was named PFA Players' Player of the Year and FWA Footballer of the Year, while playing for Tottenham Hotspur. During the 1998–99 season, Ginola scored one of his most notable goals, when Spurs played Barnsley in the FA Cup sixth Round. Ginola weaved in and out of a number of Barnsley players and finished in the left side of the net, the only goal of the game. He was the first player in Premiership history to win the award while at a club who finished the season outside of the top four. He also won his only English domestic trophy with Spurs, the 1999 League Cup with a 1–0 victory over Leicester City at Wembley Stadium. Ginola is fondly remembered by Spurs fans for his extravagant forward play and personality off the pitch. He played an integral role in their 1999 League Cup win and scoring a long range goal in a 3–1 win against Manchester United in a previous round. Ginola was inducted into the Tottenham Hotspur Hall of Fame on 11 December 2008.

Aston Villa
In July 2000, Ginola joined Aston Villa for a transfer fee of £3 million. He expressed his disappointment that Tottenham had sold him, saying the news that they had accepted the offer was a "bombshell". Villa manager John Gregory challenged Ginola to prove he could still perform in the Premiership, rather than move to a less demanding league abroad, as Ginola was now in his 33rd year and seemed unlikely to continue at professional level for much longer. After being accused by Gregory of being overweight, Ginola celebrated a goal against Manchester City by taking off his jersey to unveil his toned physique.

In January 2002, he was banned for two matches and fined £22,000 for stamping on an opponent and disputing his dismissal with the fourth official.

Everton
In 2002, Ginola signed for Everton playing five games for the club before retiring in May 2002, just after David Moyes took over as manager. Ginola was deemed surplus to requirements by Moyes, and made only one substitute appearance from March onwards. His contract was not renewed and Ginola, without a club, retired. He announced his intention to move into either acting or football coaching.

International career
Although Ginola was a very prominent French player, he did not see much action with the France national team, having been capped only 17 times in his career. In 1987, Ginola played for the France under-21 team at the Toulon Tournament. He was named the tournament's best player after France beat England 4–3 in the final.

Ginola is infamous in France for his mistake in a 1994 FIFA World Cup qualifying match against Bulgaria. France needed only a draw in their final group qualifying match on 17 November 1993 to qualify for the finals of the 1994 FIFA World Cup and Ginola had come on as a late substitute for Jean-Pierre Papin. With the score level at 1–1 in the last minute of the match, Ginola overhit a cross intended for Eric Cantona. The ball was collected by Emil Kremenliev, who launched a quick Bulgarian counterattack which resulted in Emil Kostadinov scoring the winning goal. Bulgaria thus won the match 2–1 and qualified for the 1994 World Cup finals at the expense of France.

In a television interview aired on 18 November 1993, Gérard Houllier, the manager of the France team during its entire 1994 World Cup qualifying campaign, blamed France's 2–1 defeat by Bulgaria entirely on Ginola and described him as someone who had "sent an Exocet missile through the heart of French football" and as the "assassin of the team". After being barracked by French fans and branded as the "assassin of French football" by the French press, Ginola moved to England, signing for Newcastle United. Houllier's successor Aimé Jacquet regularly selected Ginola for international matches, but often used him only as a substitute. Ginola played his last match for the national team in 1995. In April 2012, a French court dismissed Ginola's lawsuit against Gérard Houllier for alleged defamation. In the book Secrets de coachs (Coaches' Secrets), Houllier was alleged to have made disparaging remarks about Ginola and to have referred to Ginola in offensive terms, blaming him for misplacing the cross that allowed Bulgaria to launch the decisive counterattack and secure the win over France during the final minute of the 1994 World Cup qualifier.

Playing style
As a winger, Ginola was renowned for his "magical" touch on the ball and his ability to get past players from any type of position and then manage to score a goal. His ability to do that was shown in games for Tottenham and Newcastle, with his most memorable goal in Newcastle's 5–0 win over Premier League giants Manchester United on 20 October 1996, becoming a flamboyant part of the memorable "Entertainers" Newcastle side of his era, which also featured other highly acclaimed players including Alan Shearer, Les Ferdinand, Faustino Asprilla, Peter Beardsley and Keith Gillespie.

In 1999, Dutch legend Johan Cruyff remarked that it was his belief that Ginola was currently the best player in the world. Despite his talent, however, Paul Merson accused Ginola of diving in order to win fouls throughout his career; he was also notorious for his difficult character and lack of discipline both on and off the pitch, which led him to be involved in confrontations with other players as well as some of his managers. As such, his compatriot Eric Cantona criticised him for his poor mentality, despite his technical ability. In 2015, The Daily Telegraph placed Ginola at number 15 in their list of "The top 20 overrated football players of all time," describing him as "one of the world's best on his day, but unfortunately his day was very infrequent. Ginola's carefree attitude infuriated most of the managers he worked with, which is partly why he never lasted more than three years at any club. Too often Ginola was a luxury player who struggled for consistency."

Other pursuits

Acting
Ginola took his first steps towards a career in acting by attending classes at RADA.

Ginola made his debut as 'Didier the Butcher', the leading part in the Anglo-French short film Rosbeef. Rosbeef, a tale of love, lust and a kilo of sausages, premiered during the 2004 Cannes Film Festival. The same year Rosbeef won a prize, the 'Prix Coup de Coeur Canal+' at the Festival International de Cinéma et Gastronomie in Dijon. Next he played the title role, Mr Firecul the devil in the British short film Mr Firecul.

For his first feature film, The Last Drop, Ginola was cast as 'Corporal Dieter Max', a renegade German sniper alongside the likes of Agathe de la Boulaye, Michael Madsen, Nick Moran, Karel Roden and Billy Zane. This World War II heist movie premiered in Cannes in 2005 and was released as Operation Matchbox.

In 2000, Ginola made a cameo appearance in the first episode of the ITV drama series At Home with the Braithwaites. In 2003, Ginola played himself, announcing the results for the first Euro Lottery. In 2004, he played the leading role in The Centre, a BBC television documentary and in 2006 he appeared in the second series of Channel 4's Coach Trip during episode 22, in which he acted as a tour guide of Sainte-Maxime. Later that year Ginola appeared, again as himself, in the ITV series City Lights.
In 2008, Ginola appeared in an episode of Chop Shop on Discovery Turbo where he had a one-off car designed for his son's birthday and in the same year he appeared as Alexandre, a fashion photographer, in the special edition of the CBS series The Young and the Restless, shot in Paris to celebrate the 20th anniversary of the show's broadcast in France where it is known as Les Feux de l'amour.

Endorsements
Before moving to England, Ginola had already transcended the world of football by featuring in advertising campaigns for the Morgan clothing company and appearing on the catwalk for Cerruti.

In England, he fronted commercials for a.o. Braun shavers, Carte Noire coffee, Kingston Technologies memory sticks, Ladbrokes sports betting, L'Oréal hair products and Renault cars.

Ginola has featured in EA Sports' FIFA video game series; he was on the cover for the International edition of FIFA 97.

Ginola was an ambassador for the Paris 2012 Olympic bid and was also an ambassador for the French Golf Federation in their successful bid to stage the Ryder Cup 2018 in France. 
Ginola campaigned worldwide for the English FA bid to host the 2018 FIFA World Cup.

He is a campaigner for the Red Cross Anti-Landmine campaign and Unesco and was respectively patron and president of the UK based Vision and Sparks charities.

FIFA presidency candidate
On 16 January 2015, Ginola announced that he would be running for the presidency of FIFA for which he was paid a £250,000 fee by the Irish bookmaker Paddy Power. He would attempt to raise £2.3 million to fund the campaign for the FIFA presidency through contributions via a crowdfunding program. He started his campaign on the same day by denouncing the credibility of Sepp Blatter’s FIFA before admitting he knew little about the governing body's processes or institutions. The elections to select the next FIFA president would be due on 29 May 2015. Ginola withdrew his candidacy on 29 January, the deadline for candidates to formally submit their nominations, after failing to secure the support of at least five national football associations.

Football pundit
Ginola worked as a football pundit with the BBC, BT Sport, Canal Plus, CNN, Sky Sports and Talksport.

Wine making
In 2008, Ginola received a silver medal at the International Wine Challenge for a rosé wine produced at his vineyard in Provence.

Reality television
Ginola was one of the contestants in the first season of Danse avec les stars (a French version of the British TV show Strictly Come Dancing). In 2021, he was announced as a contestant on the twenty-first series of I'm a Celebrity...Get Me Out of Here! in the United Kingdom. He ultimately ended in 4th.

Personal life
Ginola married fashion model Coraline in 1991. The couple have a son and a daughter, Andrea and Carla; they lived near Saint-Tropez. They split and Ginola entered a relationship with model Maeva Denat, with whom he has a child.

On the afternoon of 19 May 2016, Ginola was playing a charity football match at the home of Jean-Stéphane Camerini (the organiser of the Mapauto Golf Cup) in Mandelieu-la-Napoule in the southeast of France when he suddenly collapsed due to cardiac arrest and then fell into a coma. He was administered cardiopulmonary resuscitation (CPR) on the pitch by fellow footballer Frédéric Mendy. Minutes later, a team of medics who had arrived in an ambulance used a defibrillator on him; it took five shocks from the machine to restore normal heart rhythm within 10 minutes. Ginola was airlifted minutes later by a helicopter to the Cardiothoracic Center of Monaco 40 km northeast of Mandelieu, where he underwent an immediate, six-hour, operation. Professor Gilles Dreyfus, who operated on Ginola, said that were it not for Mendy who administered CPR on him he would be dead, or have suffered permanent brain damage. Dreyfus said that Ginola had "very complicated coronary lesions " which required the quadruple heart bypass operation to be performed. The morning after being admitted to the hospital, Ginola woke up "perfectly normally" with no neurological damage and was "recovering well." Prof Dreyfus said Ginola was "very lucky to be alive". On 30 May 2016, Ginola was discharged from hospital and returned home, thanking people on Twitter for their "incredible messages of love and affection".

Career statistics

Club

International

Honours

Club
Paris Saint-Germain
Division 1: 1993–94
Coupe de France: 1992–93, 1994–95
Coupe de la Ligue: 1994–95

Tottenham Hotspur
Football League Cup: 1998–99

Aston Villa
UEFA Intertoto Cup: 2001

International
France U21
Toulon Tournament: 1987

Individual
Toulon Tournament Best Player: 1987
French Player of the Year: 1993 
French Division 1 Player of the Year: 1993–94
Premier League Player of the Month: August 1995, December 1998
FIFA XI: 1996
PFA Premier League Team of the Year: 1995–96, 1998–99
Tottenham Hotspur Player of the Year: 1998
PFA Players' Player of the Year: 1998–99
FWA Footballer of the Year: 1998–99

See also
 List of celebrities who own wineries and vineyards

References

External links

 
 
Sunday Times article-8 November 2009
David Ginola's Inspirational Quotes

1967 births
Living people
Sportspeople from Var (department)
French footballers
France international footballers
Association football wingers
SC Toulon players
Racing Club de France Football players
Stade Brestois 29 players
Paris Saint-Germain F.C. players
Newcastle United F.C. players
Tottenham Hotspur F.C. players
Aston Villa F.C. players
Everton F.C. players
Ligue 1 players
Ligue 2 players
Premier League players
French expatriate footballers
Expatriate footballers in England
French expatriate sportspeople in England
French people of Italian descent
I'm a Celebrity...Get Me Out of Here! (British TV series) participants
Footballers from Provence-Alpes-Côte d'Azur